Craig Steadman  (born 14 July 1982) is an English professional snooker player.

Career

Early career

Steadman began his professional career by playing Challenge Tour in 2001, at the time the second-level professional tour. He reached the quarter final at the 2006 IBSF World Championships in Amman, Jordan, where he was eliminated by Manan Chandra 6–3. He reached the final of the 2008 European Snooker Championships but was defeated 7–6 by David Grace. He first entered Main Tour for the 2009–10 season, after finishing the 2008/09 PIOS rankings on the rank 8. On 23 May 2009 he won the English Team Championship with Manchester.

2011/2012 season

He made it to the main draw of a ranking event for the first time in 2012, by beating Mike Dunn 5–3 in the wildcard round for the German Masters. He played Matthew Stevens in the first round, but was comfortably beaten 5–1. Despite not being on the main snooker tour Steadman played in all 12 of the minor-ranking Players Tour Championship events throughout the season, reaching the last 32 on four occasions. These performances were enough to see him earn a place back on the tour for the 2012–13 season. Steadman decided to accept the invitation back on to the main tour only at the last minute, as he felt snooker was distracting him from his main career as a professional artist.

2012/2013 season

Steadman took advantage of a new flatter structure used in the qualifiers for the 2013 Welsh Open, whereby he would only need to win two matches to reach the venue by defeating Yu Delu and Jamie Burnett with the loss of only one frame. However, in Newport he was whitewashed 0–4 by Stuart Bingham. Steadman played in all ten PTC's this season, with his best results being three last 32 defeats to finish 65th on the Order of Merit. His season ended when he lost 6–10 to Kurt Maflin in the second round of World Championship Qualifying to finish the year ranked world number 83.

2013/2014 season
In his opening match, Steadman defeated Marcus Campbell 5–3 to qualify for the 2013 Wuxi Classic in China where he faced Lü Haotian in the first round and lost 5–3. He also qualified for the International Championship and World Open, but lost in the opening round of each. At the China Open, Steadman beat Michael Holt and Martin O'Donnell to advance to the last 16 of a ranking event for the first time, where he was defeated 5–2 by Mike Dunn. In qualifying for the World Championship, Steadman saw off Jak Jones 10–7 to play Steve Davis in the second round. He led 9–5 before Davis won three frames in a row but Steadman then took a 46-minute 18th frame on the colours to win 10–8, in a result that relegated six-time world champion Davis from the main tour. Steadman himself lost his place on the tour in the next round when he was defeated 10–6 by Dechawat Poomjaeng as he was ranked world number 78, outside of the top 64. He entered Q School and dropped just two frames in his five matches of the first event to earn a new two-year tour card for the 2014–15 and 2015–16 seasons.

2014/2015 season

Steadman began the 2014–15 season by qualifying for the Wuxi Classic for the second year in a row and was beaten 5–2 by Marco Fu in the first round. He also qualified for the International Championship by defeating Cao Yupeng 6–4 and he saw off Graeme Dott 6–1 in the first round, before losing 6–3 to Ian Burns. Despite Anthony Hamilton being docked a frame for arriving late to their first round UK Championship meeting, Steadman was edged out 6–5 in a scrappy six-and-a-half-hour match. Steadman described his performance as pathetic afterwards, but responded in his very next event the Lisbon Open. He began the tournament with a 4–1 win over Shaun Murphy, a player who had won the last two European Tour events, and then earned a pair of deciding frame victories against Kyren Wilson (came back from 3–0 down to win 4–3) and Joe Swail (came back from 3–1 down to win 4–3). Steadman then whitewashed Stuart Bingham 4–0 to reach his first quarter-final in a professional event, where he lost 4–3 to Mark Davis.

In April, Steadman qualified for the televised stages of the World Championship for the first time, courtesy of wins over Rhys Clark, Michael White and Jamie Burnett. He described playing five-time winner of the event Ronnie O'Sullivan in the first round an honour and was defeated 10–3.

2015/2016 season

A 6–2 triumph over Li Hang saw Steadman qualify for the International Championship for the third successive year, but he lost 6–2 to Ding Junhui in the opening round. He also lost in the first round of both the UK Championship (6–3 to Zhou Yuelong) and Welsh Open (4–1 to Dechawat Poomjaeng). Steadman was knocked out in the fifth round of Q School 1 and the final round of the second event. This meant he earned a new two-year tour card by ending in first place on the Q School Order of Merit.

2016/2017 season
Steadman lost in the second round of three events in the first half of the 2016–17 season and also let 3–0 and 5–3 leads slip against Anthony McGill in the first round of the UK Championship to be defeated 6–5. His best form of the year came at the Welsh Open, where he reached the last 16 of an event for the second time in his career after eliminating Jak Jones 4–2, Sam Baird 4–1 and Anthony Hamilton 4–2. However, he was then whitewashed 4–0 by Barry Hawkins.

2017/2018 season
Steadman reached the third round of three ranking events throughout the 2017–18 season. However, he wasn't able to accumulate enough ranking points by the end of the season and was thus relegated from the tour. In May 2018 he entered Q School in a bid to re-enter the professional snooker tour. He did so defeating Adam Duffy 4–0 in the final round of the second event.

2020/2021 season
Steadman this season competed as an amateur and in the Shoot Out he made it to the semi-finals. His previous best in a ranking event was the last 16. He did not participate in qualifying for the World Championships.

Performance and rankings timeline

Career finals

Pro-am finals: 6 (1 title)

Amateur finals: 4 (1 title)

References

External links

 
Craig Steadman at worldsnooker.com
 Profile on Global Snooker

Living people
1982 births
English snooker players
People from Farnworth